Luxwoude is a village in the municipality of Opsterland in the east of Friesland, the Netherlands. It had a population of around 275 in January 2017.

The village was first mentioned in 1315 as Lukeswalde, and means the forest of Lucas (person). See also: . Luxwoude developed as a peat excavation village. It was home to 137 people in 1840.

References

Populated places in Friesland
Geography of Opsterland